Webb v. United States, 249 U.S. 96 (1919), was a United States Supreme Court case in which the Court held that prescriptions of narcotics for maintenance treatment was not within the discretion of physicians and thus not privileged under the Harrison Narcotics Act.

References

External links
 

United States Supreme Court criminal cases
United States Supreme Court cases
United States Supreme Court cases of the White Court
1919 in United States case law